Taylor Marie Hill (born March 5, 1996) is an American model. A former Victoria's Secret Angel, she appeared in the brand's annual fashion show from 2014 to 2018. She has worked for brands including Ralph Lauren, Michael Kors, and Carolina Herrera. She has also appeared in magazines such as Vogue, Elle, and Harper's Bazaar.

Early life
Hill was born in Palatine, Illinois, and raised in Arvada, Colorado. Beginning at an early age, she was a gymnast, before becoming a model. She has three siblings: sisters Logan Rae and Mackinley, and a brother Chase. Mackinley and Chase are also models. She graduated from Pomona High School in Arvada at the age of 16.

Career

Hill was discovered in 2011 at the age of 14 by talent agent Jim Jordan at a ranch in Granby, Colorado where Hill and her family rode horses. Jordan photographed Hill and subsequently shopped the images, securing her contracts with a number of modeling agencies.

In 2013, she started out her modeling career when she was featured on Intimissimi's catalog. She has been in print campaigns for Forever 21.

In 2014 she modeled for H&M and walked the Victoria's Secret Fashion Show for the first time, the youngest model on their rotation at the age of 18. That year she became the face of Rosa Cha. 

She was voted "2015's Most Promising Model" by Couturesque'''s readers. In 2015, she hosted an event for Victoria's Secret PINK. That same year she became a Victoria's Secret Angel. Also she advertised Versus Versace. In August 2015, she won "Model of the Year" in social media at Fashion Media Awards.

In 2016, she played a model in the film The Neon Demon and made her debut at No. 17 on Forbes' "The World's Top-Earning Models" list, with estimated earnings of $4 million between 2015 and 2016. In July 2016, she was named as the new face of French beauty brand Lancôme.

She has appeared in editorials for American, British, French, Spanish, Japanese, Arabian, Mexican and Turkish Vogue, Harper's Bazaar, French, Dutch and Australian Elle, W, Madame Figaro, Dazed, LOVE, V, Russian Número, Pop Magazine, British, Spanish, Turkish, Italian Cosmopolitan, Russh Magazine, Grazia, Glamour and Italian Marie Claire.

In 2016 her name has reached No. 9 with 3.6 million followers on the "Most Followed Models" list by Harper's Bazaar''. She has 22 million Instagram followers as of February 2023.

After working in campaigns and photoshoots, she walked for high fashion designers Versace, Valentino, Chanel, Armani, Moschino, Dolce & Gabbana, Brandon Maxwell, Balmain, Givenchy, Tommy Hilfiger, Fendi, H&M, Ralph Lauren, Kenzo, Alexander Wang, Lanvin, DKNY, Marc Jacobs, Miu Miu, Michael Kors and Bottega Veneta during the New York, Milan and Paris Fashion Weeks. She has been the face for advertisements of Jimmy Choo by Craig McDean, Michael Kors by Mario Testino, Topshop by Giampaolo Sgura, David Yurman by Bruce Weber and Joe's Jeans by Mario Sorrenti between 2016 and 2018.

Personal life 

She began a relationship with British cannabis entrepreneur Daniel Fryer in 2020. In June 2021, she announced their engagement.

Filmography

References

External links

 
 
 
 

1996 births
Living people
Female models from Illinois
People from Palatine, Illinois
American female models
IMG Models models
Victoria's Secret Angels
21st-century American women
American people of English descent
American people of Scottish descent
American people of Dutch descent